Luis Guevara may refer to:

 Luis Guevara Mora (born 1961), Salvadoran football goalkeeper
 Luis Alejandro Guevara (born 1975), Mexican politician